The 2009 BYU Cougars football team represented Brigham Young University in the 2009 NCAA Division I FBS football season. The Cougars were led by head coach Bronco Mendenhall and played their home games at LaVell Edwards Stadium.

The Cougars finished the season with a record of 11–2, 7–1 in Mountain West play and won the Maaco Bowl Las Vegas 44–20 over Oregon State.

Schedule

Rankings

Game summaries

Oklahoma

BYU would enter the 2009 Cowboy Classic with a 14-22 record against the Big XII. However BYU was 1-0 against the Sooners. The only previously meeting was the 1994 Copper Bowl, where BYU won 31-6.

Source:

Tulane

BYU headed back down South for their second game of the season. The Green Wave would be their featured opponent. BYU and Tulane came into the contest with a 1-1 record against each other. The last meeting between the two was back in 2001, when BYU defeated the Green Wave 70-35 in Provo.

Source:

Florida State

Source:

Colorado State

BYU would try and bounce back after the loss to FSU. The loss to FSU ended a winning streak the Cougs had had at home since 2004. With a 37-27-3 record against the Rams, things looked good for BYU.

Source:

Utah State

The 2009 Beehive Boot began with the Battle for the Old Wagon Wheel as Utah State visited the Cougars. With a 42-23-3 record in one of the longest rivalries in the nation, BYU looked to try to continue to show the FSU game was a fluke.

Source:

UNLV

After the Conference Weekend showdown, the Cougs headed on the road for their second road game of the year against a team they have thoroughly dominated, UNLV. Going into the 2009 season, the Cougars found themselves 13-3 against the Rebels lifetime.

Source:

San Diego State

Back-to-back road games would be the norm most of the season, as was this case with Vegas and then San Diego. BYU would challenge the Aztecs with a 25–7–1 record against them intact.

Source:

TCU

Heading into Homecoming BYU looked to get back on the winning track against TCU. The Cougars had won 5 of the first 7 meetings against TCU, but the Horned Frogs took the win in 2008 to get their 3rd win against the Cougars.

Source:

Wyoming

BYU hit the road for the final back-to-back road trip of the year. Their first stop would be in Laramie. The Cougars came into the game with a 42-30-3 record against the Cowboys.

Source:

New Mexico

The final road game on the back-to-back road trip took the Cougars to Albuquerque for their regular showdown with the Lobos. The Cougars came into the game with a 43-13-3 record against the Lobos.

Source:

Air Force

The final home stretch began with an old match-up against everybodies favorite run-and-gun squad, the Air Force Falcons. The Cougars came into the game with a 23-6 record against the Falcons.

Source:

Utah

The regular season ended with the third edition of the Deseret First Duel. The winner would take a 2-1 lead in head-to-head football since the Holy War became sponsored by Deseret First Credit Union. The Cougars came into the game with a 30-50-4 against the Utes. With both teams at 6-1 in conference play, and with TCU likely headed to a BCS game, BYU and Utah came in knowing the winner would be getting a berth in the Las Vegas Bowl.

Source:

Las Vegas Bowl

The fifth consecutive trip to the Las Vegas Bowl awaited BYU after their win over the Utes. Their opponent would be Bronco Mendenhall's alumni school- Oregon State, his first meeting against them with BYU. It was the first ever top 25 showdown in Vegas Bowl history. It also would feature a match of runner-up's as Oregon State was one of three teams tied for second in the Pac-10. BYU would go into the game with a 3-5 record lifetime against the Beavers. After going 19-for-30 for 192 yards with 3 touchdowns, Max Hall would win the MVP honor. Hall would leave as the most winning quarterback in BYU history at 43-9. His running back, Harvey Unga, would leave the school as the all-time leading rusher.

Source:

References

BYU
BYU Cougars football seasons
Las Vegas Bowl champion seasons
BYU Cougars football